"Thanks for the Memory" is a song released in 1938 for the film The Big Broadcast of 1938.

Thanks for the Memory may also refer to:

 Thanks for the Memory (film), a 1938 film whose title derives from the song
 Thanks for the Memory: The Great American Songbook, Volume IV, an album by Rod Stewart
 "Thanks for the Memory" (Red Dwarf), an episode of Red Dwarf
 "Thanks for the Memory (Wham Bam Thank You Mam)", a 1975 single by Slade

Thanks for the Memories may also refer to:
 "Thnks fr th Mmrs", a single released in 2007 by Fall Out Boy
 Thanks for the Memories (novel), a 2008 book by Cecelia Ahern
 "Thanks for the Memories" (Grey's Anatomy), a 2006 episode of American television series Grey's Anatomy
 "Thanks for the Memories" (Grimm), a 2014 episode of American television series Grimm

See also
Gratitude, the feeling of thankfulness
Memory (disambiguation)